Peter Andersen (born 21 December 1957) is a Danish curler.

Teams

Men's

Mixed

References

External links
 

Living people
1957 births
Danish male curlers
Danish curling champions